Vorderman's flying squirrel (Petinomys vordermanni) is a species of rodent in the family Sciuridae. It is found in Indonesia, Malaysia, and Myanmar. It was described in 1890 by the Dutch zoologist Fredericus Anna Jentink, who named it after its discoverer, the Dutch physician Adolphe Vorderman.

References

Thorington, R. W. Jr. and R. S. Hoffman. 2005. Family Sciuridae. pp. 754–818 in Mammal Species of the World a Taxonomic and Geographic Reference. D. E. Wilson and D. M. Reeder eds. Johns Hopkins University Press, Baltimore.

Petinomys
Rodents of Malaysia
Rodents of Indonesia
Rodents of Myanmar
Mammals described in 1890
Taxonomy articles created by Polbot